Bland Beginning is a 1949 mystery detective novel by British writer Julian Symons. It is the third and final novel in his trilogy featuring the Scotland Yard detective Chief Inspector Bland. It features Bland before he became a policeman, becoming involved in his first ever case.

Synopsis
When he buys his fiancée an engagement present of a first edition set of poems, a young man finds himself mixed up in a case of forgery and blackmail. To aid him he calls in the assistance of his friend Bland.

References

Bibliography
 Bargainnier, Earl F. Twelve Englishmen of Mystery. Popular Press, 1984.
 Stevenson, W. B. Detective Fiction. Cambridge University Press, 2013.
 Walsdorf, John J. & Allen, Bonnie J. Julian Symons: A Bibliography. Oak Knoll Press, 1996.

1949 British novels
Novels by Julian Symons
British detective novels
British crime novels
British mystery novels
Novels set in England
Victor Gollancz Ltd books